The Junkers L88 was Junkers' first geared V-12 engine, appearing c.1930 and based on a pair of 6-cylinder L8s. In 1932 a supercharger was added.  It was used in the first pressurised aircraft, the Junkers Ju 49 and, for a while, in the large G 38 airliner and its Japanese built military version.

Design and development

In 1929 Junkers developed their successful Junkers L5 6-cylinder inline 4-stroke aircraft engine into the L8 by increasing its rotational speed and gearing down the output shaft. Just as the L55 V-12 was made by combining two L5s, the L88 combined two L8s into a 60° V-12. This had the same bore, stroke, camshaft operated twin pairs of valves per cylinder, watercooling etc. as the L5, like the L55 driving a common crankshaft in a revised crankcase. An exhaust driven supercharger was added after a year to maintain power at high altitude and this version was named the L88a.

Operational history

Only a few L88 and L88a engines were built. The Ju 49 high altitude research aircraft initially (1932) flew with the L88 and later (1934) with the supercharged L88a. The two G38s used a variety of engines including both the L88 and the L88a. The heavy bomber variant of the G 38, built in Japan as the Mitsubishi Ki-20 was initially powered by L88as. These were replaced, as on the G 38s, by Jumo 204 diesel engines.

Applications
Junkers G 38, both L 88 and L 88a
Junkers Ju 49, both L 88 and L 88a
Mitsubishi Ki-20, L88a

Specifications

See also

References

Bibliography

L88
1930s aircraft piston engines